Parbati River is a river in Madhya Pradesh and Rajasthan, India that flows into the Chambal River. The river rises at a height of 610 m in the Vindhya range in Sehore district Madhya Pradesh And flows in Sehore District, Rajgarh District, Guna District of Madhya Pradesh and then enters in Rajasthan and flows from Baran District and Sawai Madhopur District of Rajasthan where it falls into Chambal River in Sawai Madhopur District and runs for 436 km. It is one of the Chambal River's three main tributaries, along with the Banas River and the Kali Sindh River. Ramgarh crater is located on its eastern bank.

References

Rivers of Rajasthan
Sawai Madhopur district
Rivers of India